Haunchyville is a mythical village of dwarves in Waukesha County, Wisconsin, United States. It is rumored to be located near Mystic Drive in Muskego, WI.

History 

Locals say that within the woods near Muskego, Wisconsin lives a conclave of little people, whose homes are built-to-scale and in the woods. In the mythical village is said to live an old albino man, who serves as their protector. Legend has it, if trespassers are caught, the unruly dwarves cut their legs from the knees down, so they are forced to live like one of them.

Origin 

According to the legend, after continuous exploitation of a number of circus dwarves, they revolted against their ring leader. After killing their master they hanged him in a wooded area, after first cutting off his arms and legs. To avoid being arrested, or even worse consequences from the circus community, the dwarves set out to create their own community, built exclusively for dwarves.

The Protector 

The story goes that in the woods lives an old man, among the dwarves. He is said to wait at the end of Mystic Drive, shot-gun in hand, to ward off anyone trying to cause trouble to the dwarves.

The story also goes that he first met the group of dwarves as a child. As a young boy he accidentally stumbled upon Haunchyville and, upon instantly treating them as equals, they sheltered the young boy and raised him as one of their own. As he grew up, he notoriously defended the dwarves, often resorting to violence.

In popular culture 
In Punisher #16-17 (2002), Garth Ennis used the legend as basis for a two-part story in which "little people'' formed their own mob and cut off their rival mobsters' legs from the knees down, as Haunchyville residents supposedly do to trespassers.

References

External links
 
 https://web.archive.org/web/20110718070101/http://www.wisconsinosity.com/Waukesha/tales_from_wisconsins_darkside.htm
 http://www.avclub.com/milwaukee/articles/dont-go-back-to-haunchyville,41933/
 http://www.wisconsinosity.com/Waukesha/waukesha.htm#attraction03

Wisconsin culture
Waukesha County, Wisconsin
Urban legends
Fictional populated places in Wisconsin